Life Begins Anew is a 1945 Italian melodrama film directed by Mario Mattoli and starring Alida Valli, Fosco Giachetti and Eduardo De Filippo. It was the second most popular Italian film during 1945-46 after Roberto Rossellini's Rome, Open City.

Plot
Paolo Martini, a doctor of chemistry and Italian veteran returns home to Rome after spending some time in a British Prisoner of War camp during the Second World War. After returning to find his son, Sandro, grown some years. He finds his wife, Patrizia, had some difficulty during his 6 years away. He also meets the Professor, their new next-door neighbor who lost his wife and daughter in the bombings of Napoli.

After readjusting to his new life at home, Paolo is frightened when Patrizia suddenly disappears. After searching through Rome with the Professor, he finally finds her in custody at the police station. She has been accused of murdering a man.

Patrizia admits to Paolo that during the desperate war years, she prostituted herself to pay for medicine to keep Sandro alive. Paolo is at first outraged and pushes her away. He even tried to confess to the murder to spare Patrizia, despite the advice of the investigator not to. Patrizia is eventually acquitted of the murder, but Paolo admits to wanting to leave her. The Professor's speech to Paolo at the end of the film convinces Paolo to stay and try to restart his life anew with Sandro and Patrizia.

Cast
 Alida Valli as Patrizia Martini
 Fosco Giachetti as Paolo Martini
 Eduardo De Filippo as Il professore
 Carlo Romano as Croci
 Aldo Silvani as Il giudice istruttore
 Nando Bruno as Scorcelletti, il camionista
 Anna Haardt as La baroness Magda Huberth
 Maria Donati as Maria
 Ughetto Bertucci as Righetto
 Maurizio Ceselli as Sandrino Martini, figlio di Patrizia e Paolo

Production
The film was shot on location in war-damaged Naples. This was not because the director  Mattoli wished to follow neorealist style, which he largely rejected. Interior scenes were shot at the Palatino Studios in Rome. The film was important in Giachetti's transition from one of the leading stars of the Fascist era into a figure acceptable to post-war audiences. This was partly achieved through retaining his previously strongly masculine persona which was adapted to the new conditions. Alida Valli, also a celebrated Fascist period star, received a boost from the film and went to Hollywood the following year.

References

Bibliography
 Bayman, Louis (ed.) Directory of World Cinema: Italy. Intellect Books, 2011. 
 Gundle, Stephen. Mussolini's Dream Factory: Film Stardom in Fascist Italy. Berghahn Books, 2013.
 Hipkins, Danielle & Plain, Gill (eds.) War-torn Tales: Literature, Film and Gender in the Aftermath of World War II. Peter Lang, 2007.

External links

1945 films
1940s Italian-language films
1945 drama films
Italian black-and-white films
Films shot in Naples
Films set in Rome
Films directed by Mario Mattoli
Battle of Monte Cassino
Italian drama films
Melodrama films
Minerva Film films
Films shot at Palatino Studios
1940s Italian films